Moskovskaya is a station of the Samara Metro on First Line which was opened on 27 December 2002.

References

Samara Metro stations
Railway stations in Russia opened in 2002
Railway stations located underground in Russia